Crisis is a 1950 American film noir starring Cary Grant, José Ferrer and Paula Raymond. Directed by Richard Brooks (making his directorial debut). The story of an American couple who inadvertently become embroiled in a revolution. Crisis was based on the short story titled "The Doubters" by George Tabori published in the magazine Today's Woman (Feb 1950).

Plot
Dr. Eugene Ferguson (Cary Grant), a renowned American brain surgeon, and his wife Helen (Paula Raymond) are vacationing in Latin America when a revolution breaks out. They are taken against their will to the country's dictator, Raoul Farrago (José Ferrer), who urgently needs a life-saving operation.

Over the next few days, while Ferguson trains assistants for the delicate operation, he witnesses various acts of brutality by the regime, especially by Colonel Adragon (Ramón Novarro), but his Hippocratic Oath compels him to do his best.

Roland Gonzales (Gilbert Roland), the rebel leader, kidnaps Helen to pressure her husband into making a fatal surgical "mistake." His message to Ferguson is intercepted by Isabel Farrago (Signe Hasso), the patient's wife, and the operation is a success. Helen is released unharmed when Farrago dies soon afterwards and his government is overthrown.

Cast

 Cary Grant as Dr. Eugene Norland Ferguson
 José Ferrer as Raoul Farrago
 Paula Raymond as Helen Ferguson
 Signe Hasso as Isabel Farrago
 Ramon Novarro as Colonel Adragon
 Gilbert Roland as Roland Gonzales
 Leon Ames as Sam Proctor

Reception

Reviews were mixed on this film. Bosley Crowther, film critic for The New York Times, wrote that "With such a penny dreadful story, it is remarkable that Mr. Brooks has been able to get any substance of even passing consequences on the screen. But some of his film is quite amusing and the two main performances are good. ... However, the task of surmounting the story completely and in full is beyond Mr. Brooks and his barely adequate supporting cast." The Variety review noted, "the script [from a story by George Tabori] and direction by Richard Brooks lets it get up on the soapbox too frequently." Time Out, however, had the opposite reaction to Crowther, thinking that Brooks was "adept at maintaining the tension", while of the opinion that Grant looked "as though he'd rather be holding a dry martini than a scalpel."

According to MGM records the film earned $891,000 domestically and $512,000 foreign, resulting in a loss to the studio of $72,000.

References

External links

 
 

1950 films
Metro-Goldwyn-Mayer films
American black-and-white films
1950 crime drama films
Films based on short fiction
Films directed by Richard Brooks
Films produced by Arthur Freed
Films scored by Miklós Rózsa
1950 directorial debut films
American crime drama films
Films about kidnapping
1950s English-language films
1950s American films